"Anton aus Tirol" is a song by Austrian musician Anton featuring DJ Ötzi. It was released in 1999 as the lead single from the album Das Album as both musicians' debut single. It was originally written by Slovenian author Vili Petrič in 1972. The track reached number one in Anton and DJ Ötzi's native Austria, where it stayed for 10 weeks, and in Germany, where it topped the German Singles Chart for one week; it was the best-selling single of 2000 in both countries. The single also peaked at number two in Flanders, the Netherlands, and Switzerland.

Track listing
 "Anton aus Tirol" (Party Mix) – 3:49
 "Anton aus Tirol" (Extended Fun Mix) – 5:48
 "Anton aus Tirol" (Country Radio Mix) – 3:25
 "Anton aus Tirol" (Karaoke) – 3:54
 "Aha, aha, aha?" – 5:14

Charts

Weekly charts

Year-end charts

Decade-end charts

Certifications

References

1999 songs
1999 singles
DJ Ötzi songs
EMI Records singles
Number-one singles in Austria
Number-one singles in Germany